Elmbridge railway station was a stop on the Wisbech and Upwell Tramway. It was in a projection of the parish of Emneth, Norfolk but was immediately south-east of the town of Wisbech, Cambridgeshire. It was opened on 20 August 1883 to serve nearby settlements and closed to passengers on 2 January 1928. The tramway ceased by closing to goods in 1966.

Former Services

References

Disused railway stations in Norfolk
Former Wisbech and Upwell Tramway stations
Railway stations in Great Britain opened in 1883
Railway stations in Great Britain closed in 1928